Bắc Từ Liêm (North Từ Liêm) is an urban district (quận) of Hanoi, the capital city of Vietnam. It was formed on 27 December 2013, when the rural Từ Liêm district was split into two urban districts: Bắc Từ Liêm and Nam Từ Liêm. The district currently has 13 wards, covering a total area of 45.32 square kilometers. As of 2019, there were 335,110 people residing in the district, the population density is 7400 inhabitants per square kilometer.

Geography
Bắc Từ Liêm is located at 21° 3′ 15″ N, 105° 40′ 56″ E, bordered by Đông Anh to the north across the Red River, Tây Hồ to the east, Cầu Giấy and Nam Từ Liêm to the south, and Hoài Đức and Đan Phượng to the west.

Administrative division
Bắc Từ Liêm is divided into 13 wards:

Thượng Cát
Liên Mạc
Thuỵ Phương
Tây Tựu
Đông Ngạc
Đức Thắng
Xuân Đỉnh
Xuân Tảo
Cổ Nhuế 1
Cổ Nhuế 2
Phú Diễn
Phúc Diễn
Minh Khai

Education
Hanoi University of Mining and Geology
Le Quy Don Technical University
Electric Power University
Hanoi University of Natural Resources and Environment
Hanoi University of Industry

References

Districts of Hanoi